
Gmina Krasnosielc is a rural gmina (administrative district) in Maków County, Masovian Voivodeship, in east-central Poland.

Villages
Gmina Krasnosielc contains the villages and settlements of Amelin, Bagienice Szlacheckie, Bagienice-Folwark, Biernaty, Budy Prywatne, Chłopia Łąka, Drążdżewo, Drążdżewo Małe, Drążdżewo-Kujawy, Elżbiecin, Grabowo, Grądy, Karolewo, Krasnosielc, Krasnosielc Leśny, Łazy, Niesułowo-Pach, Niesułowo-Wieś, Nowy Krasnosielc, Nowy Sielc, Papierny Borek, Perzanki-Borek, Pienice, Przytuły, Raki, Ruzieck, Sulicha, Wola Włościańska, Wola-Józefowo, Wólka Drążdżewska, Wólka Rakowska, Wymysły and Zwierzyniec.

Neighbouring gminas
Gmina Krasnosielc is bordered by the gminas of Baranowo, Jednorożec, Olszewo-Borki, Płoniawy-Bramura and Sypniewo.

References

External links
Polish official population figures 2006

Krasnosielc
Maków County